Atrium Health Navicent Peach, formally known as the Peach Regional Medical Center, is a critical access hospital located in Byron, Georgia.

History
Opening in September 1953 as a non-profit acute-care hospital, Peach County Hospital's original building was funded through a grant from the Hill–Burton Program. Peach County Hospital became Peach Regional Medical Center in 1997.

Previously located in Fort Valley, Georgia, work on a new facility in Byron started in 2012.

References

External links 
 

Hospital buildings completed in 1953
Fort Valley
Hospitals in Georgia (U.S. state)